The 2020 Giro d'Italia was a road cycling stage race that took place between 3 and 25 October, after initially being postponed due to the COVID-19 pandemic. It was originally to have taken place from 9 to 31 May 2020, as the 103rd edition of the Giro d'Italia, a three-week Grand Tour. The start of the 2020 Giro (known as the Grande Partenza) had been planned to take place in Budapest, Hungary, which would have been the 14th time the Giro has started outside Italy, and the first time a Grand Tour has visited Hungary.

The event was jeopardised by the COVID-19 pandemic in Italy, and in March 2020 it was postponed, as other early season races in Italy had been. When the government of Hungary announced they would not allow the Grande Partenza to take place, RCS Sport decided they would postpone the race to a later to-be-determined date. On 15 April, UCI announced that both Giro and Vuelta would take place in autumn after the 2020 UCI Road World Championships. On 5 May, UCI announced that the Giro would take place between 3 and 25 October, overlapping with the 2020 Vuelta a España .

The race was won by Tao Geoghegan Hart of Great Britain and Ineos Grenadiers, who finished 39 seconds ahead of Australia's Jai Hindley, having taken over leadership of his team after pre-race favourite and teammate Geraint Thomas had crashed out at an early stage. Hart also won the young riders' jersey, and became the first rider in Giro history to win the pink jersey outright on the final stage, having never worn it during the race – he entered the decisive final day time-trial level on time, but second on countback, to Hindley. The mountains jersey as won by Ruben Guerreiro and the sprinters' prize went to Simon Pellaud.

Teams

Twenty-two teams participated in the 2020 Giro d'Italia. All nineteen UCI WorldTeams are entitled, and obliged, to enter the race. Additionally, three second-tier UCI ProTeams were invited to participate in the event. The teams were announced on 16 January 2020. On 13 October 2020, ahead of the start of stage 10, Mitchelton-Scott and Jumbo-Visma withdrew all their remaining riders from the race following positive COVID-19 tests.

The teams participating in the race were:

UCI WorldTeams

 
 
 
 
 
 
 
 
 
 
 
 
 
 
 
 
 
 
 

UCI ProTeams

Pre-race favourites

Geraint Thomas, the 2018 Tour de France champion, was considered the pre-race favourite. Simon Yates was seen as one of his main challengers after beating Thomas in the lead-up race Tirreno–Adriatico. Steven Kruijswijk, a previous race leader in 2016, was another top contender, as was the only past champion in the field – two-time winner Vincenzo Nibali. 's trio of Jakob Fuglsang, Miguel Ángel López and Aleksandr Vlasov were also seen as top contenders. Other riders considered as contenders included Rafał Majka and Wilco Kelderman. Remco Evenepoel was earlier considered a favourite but did not enter the race due to injuries sustained in Il Lombardia.

Riders believed to be the main contenders for victories on the sprint stages were Arnaud Démare, Fernando Gaviria, Peter Sagan, Elia Viviani and Michael Matthews.

Route and stages

Classification leadership 

 On stage 2, João Almeida, who was second in the points classification, wore the cyclamen jersey, because first placed Filippo Ganna wore the pink jersey as the leader of the general classification. Because Ganna and Almeida were also the first two riders in the young rider classification, Mikkel Bjerg, who was third in the young rider classification, wore the white jersey. 
 On stage 3, João Almeida, who was second in the young rider classification, wore the white jersey, because first placed Filippo Ganna wore the pink jersey as the leader of the general classification.
 On stages 4–10, Harm Vanhoucke, who was second in the young rider classification, wore the white jersey, because first placed João Almeida wore the pink jersey as the leader of the general classification. On stages 11–14 and 16–18, Jai Hindley wore the white jersey for the same reason, as did Brandon McNulty on stage 15.
 On stage 21, Tao Geoghegan Hart, who was second in the young rider classification, wore the white jersey, because first placed Jai Hindley wore the pink jersey as the leader of the general classification.

Final classification standings

General classification

Points classification

Mountains classification

Young rider classification

Team classification

Intermediate sprint classification

Combativity classification

Breakaway classification

Fair play classification

Notes

References

External links
Official site

2020
2020 UCI World Tour
2020 in Italian sport
2020 in Hungarian sport
October 2020 sports events in Italy
Cycling events postponed due to the COVID-19 pandemic